Crepidula badisparsa is a species of sea snail, a marine gastropod mollusk in the family Calyptraeidae, the slipper snails or slipper limpets, cup-and-saucer snails, and Chinese hat snails.

It is a small species with flecks of tan and dark brown on the shell. It lives attached to other small gastropods in seagrass beds.  This species is unusual in that in produces lecithotrophic larvae which hatch as large pediveligers.  They swim for a short while before settling.

This species is currently found only in Panama.

Distribution
Bocas del Toro Province, Panama.

Description
The maximum recorded shell length is 13 mm.

Habitat
Minimum recorded depth is 1 m. Maximum recorded depth is 2 m.

References

Calyptraeidae
Gastropods described in 2005